NTR Amaravati International Airport  is an international airport serving Vijayawada and the Andhra Pradesh Capital Region in India. The airport is located at Gannavaram in Vijayawada, where National Highway 16 connecting Chennai to Kolkata passes through. The Airport has experienced massive growth since the beginning of the Decade. The Indian Government granted international status to the airport on 3 May 2017, and its first international flight was officially commenced on 4 December 2018 connecting Vijayawada with Singapore.

Expansion

A brand new integrated terminal building is under construction ever since its foundation stone was laid by the then Minister of Civil Aviation Suresh Prabhu and Vice President Venkaiah Naidu on 4 December 2018. The 35,000m² (376,700 ft²) steel and glass structure is being developed by the Airports Authority of India (AAI) at an estimated cost of ₹ 611 crores (US$86 million). The new terminal is being designed for peak daily handling of 1,200 (600 domestic and 400 international) passengers, with 24 check-in counters, five conveyor belts, 14 immigration counters, three customs counters, and eight gates and six aerobridges, which can accommodate large widebody aircraft, such as the Boeing 777 and Boeing 747. The new terminal's parking facilities will accommodate an additional 1,250 automobiles.
 
As of May 2022, 20% work on the new terminal has been completed, and the completed parts on the airport's expansion project includes the apron, the four-lane approach road and the runway expansion, which is expanded to 3,360 m and can handle larger aircraft. Initially, it was planned to complete the new terminal by August 2022, but due to the COVID-19 pandemic, which faced delays in work, it is now expected to be completed by the end of 2023.

Transport
Vijayawada Airport is located on National Highway 16 which connects Chennai to Kolkata and APSRTC runs AIRPORT Liner City Bus from PNBS, and the airport cab services, Ola Cabs, Uber, Rapido services are available to explore the city and as well as to reach Vijayawada Junction, Pandit Nehru Bus Station, and all major parts of the city and the state.

History 
The airfield located at Gannavaram served as an army base during the World War II, after which it was converted into a civilian airport. Air Deccan introduced a daily service between Hyderabad and Vijayawada in September 2003. Until 2011, the airport had only four flights a day operated by Kingfisher Airlines. In 2011, flag carrier Air India and private airlines Spicejet and Jet Airways introduced direct flights to the airport, but the latter terminated its service. Air Costa, a regional airline started operations in October 2013, with Vijayawada as its operational hub, which later suspended services.

To cater to the increasing passenger traffic, the foundation stone for a new interim terminal building was laid in October 2015. The terminal, designed to handle two million passengers per annum was opened on 12 January 2017. It was expected to be sufficient for passenger needs for the next four-five years until a larger integrated terminal was built. After domestic operations were shifted to the interim terminal, the old airport terminal building was closed and was prepared to handle international services. The terminal was equipped with a customs and immigration section and additional facilities and security arrangements.

The Central Government granted international status to the airport on 3 May 2017. However, it was only after the state government offered viability gap funding (VGF) to airlines for operating international flights, that private operator IndiGo bid for the contract to operate two flights a week to Singapore.

On 4 December 2018, Indigo flight 6E 33 departed for Singapore Changi Airport, marking the inaugural international flight for Vijayawada and getting an international footprint for Vijayawada. The flight was terminated in July 2019 after the six-month VGF agreement lapsed and the state government refused to extend the agreement.

Facilities

Structure 
The airport is spread over 1265 acres. Initially, it was spread over 567, and later 698 acres were pooled from adjoining villages. It has 24 parking bays for A320, B737, ATR-72, and Bombardier Q400.

Runways 
The airport has one runway:
 Runway 08/26: , ILS equipped

The airport's runway has been expanded to 3360m from 2270m. It can now handle wide body aircraft like Boeing 747, Boeing 777, Boeing 787, Airbus A330, Airbus A340 and Airbus A350.

Terminal 
The interim terminal spreads over 12,999 square metres and includes a check-in area, arrival hall, meet and greet service staircase, aviation lounge, and baggage pick up area. The lounge is spread over 3,613 square metres. The terminal can handle up to 500 passengers at a time and has 18 check-in counters.

Expansion 
A brand new integrated terminal building is under construction ever since its foundation stone was laid by the then Minister of Civil Aviation Suresh Prabhu and Vice President Venkaiah Naidu on 4 December 2018. The 35,000m² (376,700 ft²) steel and glass structure is being developed by the Airports Authority of India (AAI) at an estimated cost of ₹ 611 crores (US$86 million). The new terminal is being designed for peak daily handling of 1,200 (600 domestic and 400 international) passengers, with 24 check-in counters, five conveyor belts, 14 immigration counters, three customs counters, and eight gates and six aerobridges, which can accommodate large widebody aircraft, such as the Boeing 777 and Boeing 747. The new terminal's parking facilities will accommodate an additional 1,250 automobiles.

As of May 2022, 20% work on the new terminal has been completed, and the completed parts on the airport's expansion project includes the apron, the four-lane approach road and the runway expansion, which is expanded to 3,360 m and can handle larger aircraft. Initially, it was planned to complete the new terminal by August 2022, but due to the COVID-19 pandemic, which faced delays in work, it is now expected to be completed by the end of 2023.

Airlines and destinations

Statistics

Accidents and incidents 
On 28 August 1980, Vickers Viscount VT-DJC of Huns Air was damaged beyond economic repair when the nosewheel collapsed after the aircraft bounced three times on landing.

In February 2021, an Air India Express plane was involved in ground incident, the aircraft wing impacted a floodlight pole while taxing in. No injuries were reported. The flight originated in Doha, Qatar.

See also
 Bhogapuram Airport
 Visakhapatnam Airport

References

External links 

 Vijayawada Airport at Airports Authority of India website.

Airports in Andhra Pradesh
Transport in Vijayawada
Buildings and structures in Vijayawada
Airports established in the 1940s
1940s establishments in India
International airports in India
20th-century architecture in India